In mathematics, orthogonality is the generalization of the geometric notion of perpendicularity to the linear algebra of bilinear forms.

Two elements u and v of a vector space with bilinear form B are orthogonal when .  Depending on the bilinear form, the vector space may contain nonzero self-orthogonal vectors. In the case of function spaces, families of orthogonal functions are used to form a basis.

The concept has been used in the context of orthogonal functions, orthogonal polynomials, and combinatorics.

Definitions
 In geometry, two Euclidean vectors are orthogonal if they are perpendicular, i.e., they form a right angle.
 Two vectors, x and y, in an inner product space, V, are orthogonal if their inner product  is zero.  This relationship is denoted .
An orthogonal matrix is a matrix whose column vectors are orthonormal to each other.
 Two vector subspaces, A and B, of an inner product space V, are called orthogonal subspaces if each vector in A is orthogonal to each vector in B.  The largest subspace of V that is orthogonal to a given subspace is its orthogonal complement.
 Given a module M and its dual M∗, an element m′ of M∗ and an element m of M are orthogonal if their natural pairing is zero, i.e. .
 A term rewriting system is said to be orthogonal if it is left-linear and is non-ambiguous. Orthogonal term rewriting systems are confluent.

A set of vectors in an inner product space is called pairwise orthogonal if each pairing of them is orthogonal. Such a set is called an orthogonal set.

In certain cases, the word normal is used to mean orthogonal, particularly in the geometric sense as in the normal to a surface. For example, the y-axis is normal to the curve  at the origin.  However, normal may also refer to the magnitude of a vector. In particular, a set is called orthonormal (orthogonal plus normal) if it is an orthogonal set of unit vectors. As a result, use of the term normal to mean "orthogonal" is often avoided. The word "normal" also has a different meaning in probability and statistics.

A vector space with a bilinear form generalizes the case of an inner product. When the bilinear form applied to two vectors results in zero, then they are orthogonal. The case of a pseudo-Euclidean plane uses the term hyperbolic orthogonality. In the diagram, axes x′ and t′ are hyperbolic-orthogonal for any given ϕ.

Euclidean vector spaces
In Euclidean space, two vectors are orthogonal if and only if their dot product is zero, i.e. they make an angle of 90° (π/2 radians), or one of the vectors is zero. Hence orthogonality of vectors is an extension of the concept of perpendicular vectors to spaces of any dimension.

The orthogonal complement of a subspace is the space of all vectors that are orthogonal to every vector in the subspace.  In a three-dimensional Euclidean vector space, the orthogonal complement of a line through the origin is the plane through the origin perpendicular to it, and vice versa.

Note that the geometric concept of two planes being perpendicular does not correspond to the orthogonal complement, since in three dimensions a pair of vectors, one from each of a pair of perpendicular planes, might meet at any angle.

In four-dimensional Euclidean space, the orthogonal complement of a line is a hyperplane and vice versa, and that of a plane is a plane.

Orthogonal functions

By using integral calculus, it is common to use the following to define the inner product of two functions f and g with respect to a nonnegative weight function w over an interval :

In simple cases, .

We say that functions f and g are orthogonal if their inner product (equivalently, the value of this integral) is zero:

Orthogonality of two functions with respect to one inner product does not imply orthogonality with respect to another inner product.

We write the norm with respect to this inner product as

The members of a set of functions  are orthogonal with respect to w on the interval  if

The members of such a set of functions are orthonormal with respect to w on the interval  if

where

is the Kronecker delta.
In other words, every pair of them (excluding pairing of a function with itself) is orthogonal, and the norm of each is 1. See in particular the  orthogonal polynomials.

Examples
 The vectors (1, 3, 2)T, (3, −1, 0)T, (1, 3, −5)T  are orthogonal to each other, since (1)(3) + (3)(−1) + (2)(0) = 0, (3)(1) + (−1)(3) + (0)(−5) = 0, and (1)(1) + (3)(3) + (2)(−5) = 0.
 The vectors (1, 0, 1, 0, ...)T and (0, 1, 0, 1, ...)T are orthogonal to each other. The dot product of these vectors is 0.
This fact is a central one in Fourier series.

Orthogonal polynomials
Various polynomial sequences named for mathematicians of the past are sequences of orthogonal polynomials. In particular:
 The Hermite polynomials are orthogonal with respect to the Gaussian distribution with zero mean value.
 The Legendre polynomials are orthogonal with respect to the uniform distribution on the interval .
 The Laguerre polynomials are orthogonal with respect to the exponential distribution. Somewhat more general Laguerre polynomial sequences are orthogonal with respect to gamma distributions.
 The Chebyshev polynomials of the first kind are orthogonal with respect to the measure 
 The Chebyshev polynomials of the second kind are orthogonal with respect to the Wigner semicircle distribution.

Combinatorics
In combinatorics, two n×n Latin squares are said to be orthogonal if their superimposition yields all possible n2 combinations of entries.

See also

 Imaginary number
 Isogonal
 Isogonal trajectory
 Orthogonal complement
 Orthogonal group
 Orthogonal matrix
 Orthogonal polynomials
 Orthogonalization
 Gram–Schmidt process
 Orthonormal basis
 Orthonormality
 Orthogonal transform
 Pan-orthogonality occurs in coquaternions

References

Abstract algebra
Linear algebra
Orthogonality